The Apostolic Church in Italy is an Italian Protestant denomination in the Pentecostal-evangelical tradition founded in 1927, which is part of the worldwide fellowship of the Apostolic Church and the Federation of Evangelical Churches in Italy, an ecumenical body representing Italian Protestants.
Its headquarter is in Grosseto.

In 2007 the Church and the Italian government signed an agreement, in accordance with article 8 of the Italian Constitution, that became law in 2012.

See also
Religion in Italy
Christianity in Italy
Protestantism in Italy
List of Italian religious minority politicians

References

External links
Official website

Protestantism in Italy
Pentecostal denominations in Europe